Eschweiler is a small town in northern Luxembourg. It is located in the canton of Wiltz, which is part of the district of Diekirch.

It was a former commune but was merged with the commune of Wiltz in 2015.

, the town of Eschweiler has a population of 195.

Former commune
The former commune consisted of the villages:

 Eschweiler
 Erpeldange
 Knaphoscheid
 Selscheid
 Eschweiler-Halte (lieu-dit)
 Klenghouschent (lieu-dit)

References

Former communes of Luxembourg
Towns in Luxembourg
Wiltz